Archibald McE. Swann was a Scottish amateur footballer who played as a full back in the Scottish League for Queen's Park.

Personal life 
Swann served as a lieutenant in the Royal Army Medical Corps during the First World War.

References

Year of birth missing
Scottish footballers
Scottish Football League players
British Army personnel of World War I
Association football fullbacks
Queen's Park F.C. players
Royal Army Medical Corps officers
Place of death missing
Place of birth missing
Year of death missing
Partick Thistle F.C. players